Aw Chu Kee (born 1926) was a Burmese weightlifter. He competed in the men's bantamweight event at the 1956 Summer Olympics.

References

External links
 

1926 births
Possibly living people
Burmese male weightlifters
Olympic weightlifters of Myanmar
Weightlifters at the 1956 Summer Olympics
Place of birth missing